Edmund Carl Marius Møller Hansen (9 September 1900 – 26 May 1995) was a Danish track cyclist who won a silver medal at the 1924 Summer Olympics in the Tandem along with Willy Hansen.

References

External links
 
 

1900 births
1995 deaths
Danish male cyclists
Olympic silver medalists for Denmark
Olympic cyclists of Denmark
Cyclists at the 1924 Summer Olympics
Olympic medalists in cycling
Sportspeople from Odense
Medalists at the 1924 Summer Olympics